Kufranjah is one of the districts of Ajloun governorate, Jordan. 

In 2011, Prince William of the British Royal Family visited Kufranjah to meet refugee communities on a Tour of Jordan and Israel. 

In 2021, wildfires heavily damaged forests in Aljoun, prompting a movement aiming to plant 10 million trees in Jordan by 2031. The epicenter of the "10 million trees" movement began in Kufranjah.

References

External Links
Photos of Kufrinjah at the American Center of Research

Districts of Jordan